In mathematics, the -dimensional integer lattice (or cubic lattice), denoted , is the lattice in the Euclidean space  whose lattice points are -tuples of integers. The two-dimensional integer lattice is also called the square lattice, or grid lattice.  is the simplest example of a root lattice. The integer lattice is an odd unimodular lattice.

Automorphism group
The automorphism group (or group of congruences) of the integer lattice consists of all permutations and sign changes of the coordinates, and is of order 2n n!. As a matrix group it is given by the set of all n×n signed permutation matrices. This group is isomorphic to the semidirect product

where the symmetric group Sn acts on (Z2)n by permutation (this is a classic example of a wreath product).

For the square lattice, this is the group of the square, or the dihedral group of order 8; for the three-dimensional cubic lattice, we get the group of the cube, or octahedral group, of order 48.

Diophantine geometry
In the study of Diophantine geometry, the square lattice of points with integer coordinates is often referred to as the Diophantine plane. In mathematical terms, the Diophantine plane is the Cartesian product  of the ring of all integers . The study of Diophantine figures focuses on the selection of nodes in the Diophantine plane such that all pairwise distances are integer.

Coarse geometry
In coarse geometry, the integer lattice is coarsely equivalent to Euclidean space.

Pick's theorem

Pick's theorem, first described by Georg Alexander Pick in 1899, provides a formula for the area of a simple polygon with all vertices lying on the 2-dimensional integer lattice, in terms of the number of integer points within it and on its boundary.

Let  be the number of integer points interior to the polygon, and let  be the number of integer points on its boundary (including both vertices and points along the sides). Then the area  of this polygon is:

The example shown has  interior points and  boundary points, so its area is  square units.

See also
Regular grid

Further reading

References

Euclidean geometry
Lattice points
Diophantine geometry